The Lola B02/50 is an open-wheel formula race car chassis developed by British manufacturer Lola, for use in the International Formula 3000 series, a feeder-series for Formula One, from 2002 to 2004, until it was replaced by the new Dallara GP2/05 chassis for the new GP2 Series in 2005.

Final year specifications 
Compression ratio: 13.0:1
Bore: 
Stroke: 
Engine weight: 
Fuel delivery: Electronic-indirect fuel injection
Aspiration: Naturally-aspirated
Steering: Non-assisted rack and pinion

References 

Open wheel racing cars
International Formula 3000
Lola racing cars